Episimoides is a genus of moths belonging to the subfamily Olethreutinae of the family Tortricidae.

There is only one species in this genus: Episimoides erythraea Diakonoff, 1957 that is found in La Réunion.

See also
List of Tortricidae genera

References

External links
mnhn.fr: images of this species
tortricidae.com

Tortricidae genera
Olethreutinae
Taxa named by Alexey Diakonoff